Cortellini is an Italian surname. Notable people with the surname include:

Ángel María Cortellini (1819–1887), Spanish painter
Camillo Cortellini (1561–1630), Italian composer, singer, and violinist
Roberto Cortellini (born 1982), Italian footballer

Italian-language surnames